Grand Ayatollah Sheikh Mohammad Ibrahim al-Karbasi (1766–1845) known as Sahib al-Isharat was a Shia jurist, mujtahid, fundamentalist, Quran commentator, theologian, scholar of biographical evaluation and marja', and considered the reviver of the Isfahan Seminary in the 19th-century.

Early life and education
al-Karbasi was born on 24 September 1766 in Isfahan, Iran, to Sheikh Muhammad-Hasan al-Karbasi. The Karbasi family claim descent from Malik al-Ashtar, the noble companion of the first Shia Imam, Ali. His father passed away when he was ten years old.

His father died when he was ten years old, and went on to study under Agha Muhammad Bidabadi. He then travelled across a number of cities to acquire knowledge, and this included, Karbala, Najaf, Kadhimiya, Qom, and Kashan. In theses different cities, he studied under greats like Sheikh Muhammad-Baqir Behbehani, Sayyid Muhammad-Mehdi Bahr al-Uloom, Sheikh Jafar Kashif al-Ghita, and Sheikh Muhammad-Mehdi al-Naraqi.

al-Karbasi excelled in his studies, and managed to make an exceptional connection between Islamic mysticism, which was taught by his teacher, Binabadi, as well as Usulism, which was founded by his teacher, Behbehani.

Also, his most famous masters in Isfahan are:

 Mulla Ali Noori Mazandarani
 Mulla Mehrab Gilani
 Mirza Mohammad Ali MirzaMozaffar
 Mir Mohammad Hossein Khatoonabadi
 Sheikh Mohammad Ali Harandi
 Sheikh Mohammad ibn Sheikh Zeynoddin

Religious career
al-Karbasi became an expert in several fields of Islamic sciences. He taught Fiqh and Principles of Islamic jurisprudence in the Hakim Mosque of Isfahan, and in this field, raised many students who among them are:

 Sheikh Hadi Sabzavari
 Mirza Shirazi
 Mohammad ibn Soleiman Tonekaboni
 Sayyid Hassan Modarres Isfahani
 Sheikh Mahdi Qomsheh'ee
 Sayyid Mohammad Shahshahani
 Sheikh Hamzeh Qaeni
 Sayyid Muhammad-Hassan Mojtahed Isfahani

Works
Ayatollah Mohammad Ibrahim Kalbasi, along with his educational, training and propaganda efforts, was engaged in writing and researching and has written works in the field of Fiqh, Principles of Islamic jurisprudence and other Islamic teachings, which include:

 Esharat al-Osul (Signs of the Usul)
 Ershad al-Mostarshedin fi Marefateh men Ahkam al-Din (The guidance of the guides in the knowledge of the rules of religion)
 Al-Nokhbeh (The elite)
 Menhaj al-Hedayah ela Ahkam al-Sharia va Forooe al-Fiqh (The curriculum of guidance to the provisions of Sharia and the branches of jurisprudence)
 Al-Soal va al-Javab fi al-Fiqh va al-Ahkam (Question and answer in jurisprudence and rulings)
 Shawarie al-Hidayah fi Sharh al-Kefayah al-Muqtasid (Ways of guidance in the explanation of the frugal sufficiency)
 Taqlid al-Meyyet (The dead tradition)
 Al-Iqaazaat (The adjournments)
 Resaleh ee dar Sahih va Aam; Dar Elme Osule Feqh (A treatise on the correct and general; In the science of the principles of jurisprudence)
 Naqd al-Usul (Critique of principles)
 Manaseke Hajj (Hajj rituals)
 Resaleh ee dar Mofattar Boodane Qelyan ya Tootoon (A treatise on the nullifier of hookah or tobacco)

At the insistence of the people and the insistence of the jurists and authorities of the time, such as Mirza-ye Qomi, he published a treatise of "Nokhbeh" (The elite), which is the first collections of juridical edicts or clarifications of questions (Risalah (fiqh)) in Persian.

Social actions
He was one of the opponents of the Sufi orders in Isfahan. It is also said that he warned Fath-Ali Shah Qajar and some rulers of the time for neglecting the masses and monitoring the prices of goods.

Death
Al-Karbasi died on the night of Thursday, 15 May 1845, at the age of 81, and according to his will, he was buried in a place in front of the Hakim Mosque, in the family's crypt.

See also
 Mirza-ye Qomi
 Seyyed Mohammad Hojjat Kooh Kamari
 Sayyed Ibrahim Estahbanati
 Agha Hossein Khansari
 Mohammad Jafar Sabzevari
 Mohaghegh Sabzevari

References

External links
 Tomb of Mohammad Ibrahim Kalbasi
 Kalbāsī, Muḥammad Ibrāhīm — Brill
 Portrait: Kalbasi Muhammad Ibrahim - Ullama & Marajay

1766 births
1845 deaths
Shia clerics from Isfahan
Iranian grand ayatollahs
Writers from Isfahan
18th-century Iranian writers
19th-century Iranian writers